Paraguay participated at the 2017 Summer Universiade which was held in Taipei, Taiwan.

Paraguay sent a delegation consisting of 10 competitors for the event competing in 2 sporting events. Paraguay didn't win any medals in the multi-sport event.

Participants

References 

2017 in Paraguayan sport
Nations at the 2017 Summer Universiade